Pabrik Kertas Indonesia or commonly known abbreviated as Pakerin or PT. Pakerin is an Indonesian pulp and paper company based in Surabaya, East Java. Pakerin was founded in 1977 at Mojokerto Regency by Njoo, Soegiharto.

History 
In 1970s, many sugar mills in Indonesia faced waste disposal problems. Only a small portion of their wastes (bagasse) can be used as fuels. As the result, sugar mills had to spend a significant amount of money for disposal purposes. Similarly, factories producing corrugated cardboard boxes and printed paper experienced difficulty in disposing their wastes, rejects, and paper trims.

Njoo Soegiharto, the founder of Pakerin, saw the opportunity to use the waste as a raw material to manufacture pulp and paper. This idea is also supported by the fact that most industrial papers had to be imported from overseas. Responding to these market opportunities, PT. Pakerin was established in 1977 in Bangun Village, Mojokerto Regency is approximately distance about 38 km from southwestern of Surabaya.

Pakerin started its business with one bagasse pulping plant, one waste water treatment plant, and one paper machine producing Duplex Board. On December 28, 1985 Pakerin expanded its factory with 6 paper mills with an installed capacity of 700,000 tons per year.

Products 
Pakerin produces various kinds of industrial paper / paperboard used for offset printing and corrugated boxes :

 Coated Duplex
Kraft Liner
 Test Liner
Medium Liner
 Core Board
 Grey Board
Pakerin also produces various kinds of chemicals:
 Caustic Soda
 Liquid Chlorine
 Hydrochloric Acid
 Sodium Hypochlorite

See also 

 List of paper mills

References

External links 

 Official Website of Pabrik Kertas Indonesia

Pulp and paper companies of Indonesia
Manufacturing companies established in 1977
Indonesian brands
Indonesian companies established in 1977
Companies based in Surabaya